Efraín Juárez Valdez (born 22 February 1988) is a Mexican former professional footballer and current assistant manager of Standard Liege.

Early career 

He began his career in the basic forces of the Pumas, being also a regular in practically all the youth categories of the Mexican team. After his brilliant performance in the U-17 World Cup in Peru, in which Mexico was champion, Juárez accepted an offer from FC Barcelona and headed to Spain. Once there, in La Masía, they discovered that Juárez was in the calendar year of majority, so his condition as a foreigner only allowed him to play in the first team or in FC Barcelona B. His months in Barcelona were limited to train and not play for that reason. "Chucho" Ramírez, coach with whom he won the U-17 World Cup in Peru, took over the Mexican U-20 team. He himself warned Juárez that he wanted to take the team of champion players in Peru to the World Cup in Canada, but that he must see action or he would be left out. Juárez's decision was to ask Barcelona to let him go to a team, the humble Barbate, with whom he could play for a few months to enter Ramírez's list. Nobody in Barcelona understood that decision, but the footballer has always maintained that any decision must be understandable if the reward is to defend the colors of Mexico. He had a great tournament, despite the fact that El Tri was defeated in the quarterfinals against the champion team in the end, Argentina. In Canada he made the decision to want to leave FC Barcelona to return to Mexico, since he received offers from various teams that guaranteed him to play in the elite, something that was not guaranteed in Spain.

Club career

Club Universidad Nacional
Juárez joined the Pumas youth system at the age of thirteen. After winning the 2005 under-17 World Championship, playing a key role in defense, he was snapped up by Barcelona along with national teammate Jorge Hernández in 2006. Without very much support and very few minutes given in the Barcelona B team, he returned to Pumas Morelos and it took some time for coach Ricardo Ferretti to call him to Pumas. Competing for a position in the right wing with Fernando Espinoza, he quickly became a starter in Ferretti's team. With Ferretti's decision to give continuity to its team, Juárez renewed his contract facing the Clausura 2009 tournament. Pumas finished champions, beating Pachuca.

Celtic
On 17 July 2010, Pumas accepted a bid for Juárez from Scottish Premier League club Celtic. On 26 July a £2 million transfer was agreed and Juárez signed a four-year contract with The Hoops, making him the first ever Mexican player to play in the SPL. Juárez made his Celtic debut in a 3–0 Champions League defeat away to Braga. He scored his first goal for the club in the return fixture at Celtic Park with a header. He then scored his second goal, again at Celtic Park, in a Europa League qualifying first leg match against Utrecht two weeks later.  Juárez was close to agreeing a loan move to Serie A side Brescia Calcio in the January 2011 transfer window but the deal fell through.  He had fallen out of favour with the first team and his agent admitted that Juárez would need to move on in the summer of 2011 in order to play first team football.

Real Zaragoza (loan)

On 26 July 2011, after weeks of speculation, Juárez was loaned out to La Liga side Real Zaragoza, where he was reunited with former Mexico national team coach Javier Aguirre. He made his debut for Zaragoza in a 6–0 loss against Real Madrid. He then scored his first goal for the club in a 4–3 defeat to Real Betis.

América
On 5 June 2012 it was announced that Juárez had transferred to América in Mexico for an undisclosed fee, after failing to cement his place in the starting line-up for Celtic, and after his disappointing stint for Real Zaragoza. He made his first appearance for América on 27 June in a 0–2 preseason loss against Jaguares. He made his league debut on 21 July in a 0–0 draw against Monterrey. On 22 August 2012, Efrain suffered a terrible arm injury during a cup game against Correcaminos in the 39th minute which he had to miss a few months.

Vancouver Whitecaps FC 
Juárez signed with Vancouver Whitecaps FC of Major League Soccer on 18 January 2018. On 1 February 2019, Juárez and Vancouver mutually agreed to part ways.

New York City FC assistant manager 
On 10 March 2020, it is reported that Efraín Juárez joined as a technical assistant for the New York City FC of the Major League Soccer.

International career
On 28 June 2009, Juárez made his first international cap with the senior national team against Guatemala. Juárez played a part of the team that won the 2009 CONCACAF Gold Cup. In the Gold Cup, he mainly played at right back. He started and completed all games played in the competition. Thanks to his great performance, he quickly gained a spot on the national team. Juárez scored for Mexico against Costa Rica during a penalty shootout.

On 11 June 2010, Juárez became the first player to be booked at the 2010 World Cup in Mexico's opening match against South Africa. He also played in Mexico's 2–0 victory over France on 17 June, when he was replaced by Javier Hernández on 55 minutes, who later himself went on to score.

On 22 September 2010, it was announced that Juárez and Mexico teammate Carlos Vela were banned from international duty for six months for their involvement in a party in Monterrey following a game with Colombia two weeks earlier.

Juárez scored his first goal for the national team in the 5–0 win against El Salvador in the opening match of the 2011 CONCACAF Gold Cup on 5 June.

International goals
Scores and results list Mexico's goal tally first

|- 
| 1. || 5 June 2011 || Cowboys Stadium, Arlington, United States ||  || align=center|1–0 || align=center|5–0 || 2011 CONCACAF Gold Cup
|}

Career statistics

Club

International

Honours
UNAM
Primera División: Clausura 2009

América
Liga MX: Clausura 2013

Monterrey
Copa MX: Apertura 2017

Mexico U17
FIFA U-17 World Championship: 2005

Mexico
CONCACAF Gold Cup: 2009, 2011

References

External links
Real Zaragoza official profile 

2010 FIFA World Cup profile

1988 births
Living people
Footballers from Mexico City
Mexican footballers
Association football defenders
Association football midfielders
Liga MX players
Club Universidad Nacional footballers
Club América footballers
Scottish Premier League players
Celtic F.C. players
La Liga players
Real Zaragoza players
C.F. Monterrey players
Vancouver Whitecaps FC players
Vålerenga Fotball players
Mexico under-20 international footballers
Mexico international footballers
2009 CONCACAF Gold Cup players
2010 FIFA World Cup players
2011 CONCACAF Gold Cup players
CONCACAF Gold Cup-winning players
Mexican expatriate footballers
Mexican expatriate sportspeople in Spain
Mexican expatriate sportspeople in Scotland
Expatriate footballers in Scotland
Expatriate footballers in Spain
Expatriate soccer players in Canada
Expatriate footballers in Norway
Mexico youth international footballers
Major League Soccer players
Eliteserien players
New York City FC non-playing staff